Gabriella (Gaby) Angelini (1911 - 3 December 1932) was an Italian aviator.

Angelini was born in Milan to a wealthy family. She earned her pilot's license at the age of 19, and quickly became a popular figure in Italy. She was the first Italian woman to complete a trans-European flight, travelling to eight European countries, for which she received a Golden Eagle Medal. In 1932 she left Italy on a solo flight to Delhi, India, travelling in a Breda Ba.15 aeroplane. Angelini encountered difficulties during a sandstorm in Libya en route, and crashed in the desert and died. More than 120,000 people attended her funeral in Milan.

In 2014 a book was published about Angelini's life, titled La Leggenda di Little Gaby (The Legend of Little Gaby).

References

1911 births
1932 deaths
Aviators killed in aviation accidents or incidents
Italian aviators
Italian women aviators
People from Milan
Victims of aviation accidents or incidents in 1932